Gilberto Arnulfo Velazquez (born October 17, 1979) is an American former professional baseball infielder current coach. He is currently the defensive coordinator for the Arizona Diamondbacks of Major League Baseball (MLB). Velazquez is a graduate of Paramount High School in Paramount, California. Velazquez played in the New York Mets, Minnesota Twins, Boston Red Sox, Los Angeles Angels of Anaheim and Miami Marlins organizations.

Career

New York Mets
Velazquez was drafted by the New York Mets in the 14th round of the 1998 Major League Baseball draft and made his pro debut with the Gulf Coast Mets the same year. He remained in the Mets farm system through 2004, playing for the Kingsport Mets of the Appalachian League, Capital City Bombers of the South Atlantic League, St. Lucie Mets of the Florida State League, Binghamton Mets of the Eastern League and Norfolk Tides of the International League.

Minnesota Twins
Velazquez signed as a minor league free agent with the Minnesota Twins on November 15, 2004, where he remained through 2007. With the Twins he split his time between the Eastern League's New Britain Rock Cats and the International Leagues' Rochester Red Wings.

Boston Red Sox

Velazquez signed a minor league contract with the Boston Red Sox on December 7, 2007, and was invited to  spring training.  He played the majority of the season with the team's AAA affiliate Pawtucket Red Sox, but was called up late in the season. Velazquez made his Major League debut on September 25, 2008, and played in two more games afterwards with one hit in eight at-bats. His hit was an RBI single to left field off of Alfredo Aceves of the New York Yankees on September 26.

After Mike Lowell was placed on the disabled list in the middle of the 2008 American League Division Series, Velazquez filled his roster spot, and became eligible to play in game four of the playoffs after only three major league appearances and one major league hit, he did not appear in the series.

Velazquez was invited to 2009 spring training as well after signing a new minor league contract on November 10, 2008. On April 11, 2009, he was called up to the Red Sox while Julio Lugo spent time on the disabled list. Gil was optioned back to Pawtucket when Boston called up Michael Bowden.
On May 12, 2009, Velazquez was recalled to Boston when Kevin Youkilis was placed on the 15-day disabled list. Velazquez was optioned back to Pawtucket on May 20 when Kevin Youkilis was activated from the disabled list. On August 5, Velazquez was designated for assignment. He appeared in a total of six games with the Red Sox and did not record a hit in his two-at-bats.

On January 15, 2010, Velazquez was re-signed by the Red Sox and again invited to spring training. He spent the entire 2010 season with Pawtucket, where he finished the season with a .249 average.

Los Angeles Angels of Anaheim
Velazquez was signed by the Los Angeles Angels of Anaheim on January 14, 2011 to a minor league contract with an invite to spring training.

He was assigned to the Angels AAA Pacific Coast League affiliate, the Salt Lake Bees, on April 6, 2011. There, Velazquez was named to the 2011 PCL All-Star team.
Velazquez, a 31-year-old native of Los Angeles, appeared in 123 games for the Bees in 2011, hitting a team-high and career-high .328 with 25 doubles, five triples, eight home runs, 58 RBI and 17 stolen bases.

The Angels recalled Velazquez on Tuesday, September 6, 2011, during September roster expansions. Velazquez, who plays second base, third base and shortstop, made his Angels debut on September 16, 2011, pinch hitting against the Baltimore Orioles. Velazquez appeared in three more games in 2011. He had three hits in six at-bats.

Miami Marlins
After being granted free agency by the Angels' organization, Velazquez signed a minor league deal with the Miami Marlins, and was assigned to the AAA affiliate New Orleans Zephyrs. On August 16, Velazquez was called up to the major league team. The next day, he started in his first game for the Marlins. He finished the season batting .232 in 56 at-bats with 2 RBI, no homers, one double and walk, in 19 games. He was outrighted off the Marlins roster on October 4, 2013 and elected free agency rather than accept a minor-league assignment.

Aguilas De Mexicali/Leones De Yucatán
Velazquez played for Mexico at the 2013 World Baseball Classic. He then played for Águilas de Mexicali in the Mexican Pacific League and Leones de Yucatán in the Mexican League.

Coaching
In 2015, he retired from active duty to become a coach for the Arizona League Dodgers. The following year, he was named manager of the Great Lakes Loons, the Dodgers class-A affiliate in the Midwest League.

References

External links

1979 births
Living people
Águilas de Mexicali players
American expatriate baseball players in Mexico
American baseball players of Mexican descent
Baseball coaches from California
Baseball players from Los Angeles
Binghamton Mets players
Boston Red Sox players
Capital City Bombers players
Gulf Coast Mets players
Kingsport Mets players
Leones de Yucatán players
Los Angeles Angels players
Major League Baseball second basemen
Major League Baseball shortstops
Major League Baseball third basemen
Mexican League baseball second basemen
Miami Marlins players
Minor league baseball coaches
Minor league baseball managers
Naranjeros de Hermosillo players
New Britain Rock Cats players
New Orleans Zephyrs players
Norfolk Tides players
Pawtucket Red Sox players
Rochester Red Wings players
Salt Lake Bees players
Scranton/Wilkes-Barre RailRiders players
St. Lucie Mets players
2013 World Baseball Classic players